Corta Atalaya is the largest open-pit mine in Europe and was at one time the largest in the world. It is located within the city limits of Minas de Riotinto in the province of Huelva, autonomous community of Andalusia, Spain. It was one of the most ambitious projects of the Rio Tinto Group. At its peak it employed 2,000 workers mining copper; it was actively mined until 1992. Since at least 1994 it has been flooded up to the 16th ring.

This open-pit mine in the western part of the Masa San Dionisio was begun in 1907 after major subsidence in some of the higher-altitude parts of the area two years earlier, caused by the combustion of pyrites in the earlier subterranean mines. The mines were nationalized in 1954 but later sold back to a private company. As of October 2009, the current owner, EMED Tartessus, says they will have the mine operating again before the end of 2013.

Geology
Corta Atalaya is a mine in western part of the Iberian Pyrite Belt. It is part of a zone of volcanogenic massive sulfide ore deposits of Silurian to Carboniferous age which has produced significant copper, zinc, lead, gold and silver.

La Atalaya 

The village of La Atalaya was constructed for the subterranean mining of the San Dionisio seam, which in 1907 became the Corta Atalaya open-pit mine.

In 1873, Rio Tinto Company, later Rio Tinto Group, acquired the mines of Riotinto. Encountering the problem of transporting miners from their homes to their workplaces, and taking only economic concerns into consideration, they planned construction of houses where the miners had already built huts to stay overnight near the mines. Thus, the village of La Atalaya was founded in 1883. The company simply substituted more durable buildings for the huts, constructing neighborhoods in the locations the miners had already chosen.

The company then went on to build a public plaza, chapel, grocery store, casino, school, and a Guardia Civil barracks. For almost a century, this was home to many of the miners, first those working in the subterranean mine and then in the Corta Atalaya open pit. The population peaked around 1910:

In 1970, La Atalaya had 257 buildings and a population of 823. That year, approval was received to enlarge the pit; in 1971, La Atalaya was destroyed because it was in the path of the mining.

La Atalaya was not the only townsite sacrificed to the mine. Earlier, the original location of Minas de Riotinto lay in the path of the mine; the town was moved to its present site.

After closure
As of 2008, EMED Mining owns 100% of the mine, through its 100%-owned subsidiary, EMED Tartessus SL. EMED Tartessus is currently tasked with cleaning and restarting the mine, and Proyecto de Rio Tinto to operate it for the long term.

For some time after the mine closed in 1992, it was possible to visit the mine. EMED Tartessus did not allow the public to visit as of 2007, but was discussing the possibility of changing that.

EMED projects that eventually the mine will again employ 450 people, and that they will be spending over €130 million per year in Spain. As of September 2007, they had spent €3.5 million and budgeted another €15 million toward cleanup and resumption of operations. As of 26 October 2009, they projected that production would resume by the end of 2010.

Two films have used the former mine as a locale: El corazón de la tierra, directed by Antonio Cuadri and based on the novel of the same name by Juan Cobos Wilkins, a political-historical film about the Rio Tinto mines; and the science fiction film Proxima, written and directed by Carlos Atanes, which used the mine as an otherworldly landscape.

The nearby golf course Club de Golf Atalaya has grass only on its putting greens. Originally the North Lode Golf Club, founded in 1890, it was Spain's oldest, but was abandoned to the growth of the Corta Atalaya pit. It reopened in 1992 under its current name and configuration.

Gallery

The following images help to give a sense of the scale of the mine.

Notes

External links
 Clive Boulter (University of Southampton), CORTA ATALAYA - the westernmost mine in the Rio Tinto camp, part of The Iberian Pyrite Belt: physical volcanology

Buildings and structures in the Province of Huelva
Geography of the Province of Huelva
Iberian Pyritic Belt
Mines in Spain
Open-pit mines
Surface mines in Spain